Pendra Road railway station is a main railway station in Gaurella-Pendra-Marwahi district, Chhattisgarh. Its code is PND. It serves Pendra city as well as Gaurella. The station consists of three platforms. The platforms are well sheltered. It has facilities including water and sanitation.

Major trains

The following trains run from Pendra Road railway station:

 Ajmer–Durg Weekly Express
 Amarkantak Express
 Ambikapur Durg Express-cum-Passenger
 Barauni–Gondia Express
 Betwa Express
 Bhagat Ki Kothi–Visakhapatnam Weekly Express
 Bhopal Bilaspur Express
 Bilaspur–Rewa Fast Passenger
 Bilaspur Chirmiri Passenger
 Bilaspur Katni MEMU
 Bilaspur Pendra Road MEMU
 Chhattisgarh Sampark Kranti Superfast Express
 Chirmiri Durg Express-cum-Passenger
 Durg–Jaipur Weekly Express
 Durg–Jammu Tawi Express (via Amritsar) 
 Durg–Nautanwa Express (via Varanasi)
 Durg–Nautanwa Express (via Sultanpur)
 Durg–Jammu Weekly Superfast Express 
 Hirakud Express
 Kalinga Utkal Express 
 Lucknow–Raipur Garib Rath Express
 Narmada Express
 Valsad–Puri Superfast Express
 Sarnath Express
 Shalimar–Udaipur City Weekly Express

References

Railway stations in Bilaspur district, Chhattisgarh
Bilaspur railway division